James Joseph MacNamee was an Irish Roman Catholic Bishop in the 20th Century.

McNamee was born at Fintona on 11 December 1876. He was educated at St Macartan's College, Monaghan and St Patrick's College, Maynooth. After curacies at Clones and Monaghan he was Administrator of Monaghan then Parish Priest at Clones.

MacNamee was appointed  Bishop of Ardagh and Clonmacnoise on 20 June 1927 and consecrated on 31 July that year.  He died on 24 April 1966 and was succeeded by Cahal Daly, later Archbishop of Armagh.

References

1876 births
People from County Tyrone
People educated at St Macartan's College, Monaghan
Alumni of St Patrick's College, Maynooth
1966 deaths
20th-century Roman Catholic bishops in Ireland
Roman Catholic bishops of Ardagh and Clonmacnoise